Ariolimacidae is a family of air-breathing land slugs, terrestrial pulmonate gastropod mollusks in the superfamily Arionoidea (according to the taxonomy of the Gastropoda by Bouchet & Rocroi, 2005).

Subfamilies and genera
The family Ariolimacidae consists of the two subfamilies:
 Ariolimacinae Pilsbry & Vanatta, 1898
 Zacoleinae Webb, 1959

Genera in the family Ariolimacidae include:

Ariolimacinae
 Anadenulus Cockerell, 1890 
 Ariolimax Mörch, 1859 - banana slug - the type genus of the family Ariolimacidae
 Hesperarion Simroth, 1891 
 Magnipelta Pilsbry, 1953 
 Meadarion Pilsbry, 1948 
 Prophysaon Bland & W.G. Binney, 1873 
 Udosarx Webb, 1959 

Zacoleinae
 Zacoleus Pilsbry, 1903 - the type genus of the subfamily Zacoleinae

Genera brought into synonymy
 Aphallarion Pilsbry & Vanatta, 1896: synonym of Ariolimax Mörch, 1859
 Limacarion J.G. Cooper, 1879: synonym of Prophysaon Bland & W.G. Binney, 1873
 Phenacarion Cockerell, 1890: synonym of Prophysaon Bland & W.G. Binney, 1873

References

  Bouchet P., Rocroi J.P., Hausdorf B., Kaim A., Kano Y., Nützel A., Parkhaev P., Schrödl M. & Strong E.E. (2017). Revised classification, nomenclator and typification of gastropod and monoplacophoran families. Malacologia. 61(1-2): 1-526.

External links